Juan Carlos Díaz Mena (born 20 May 2001) is a Colombian footballer who plays as a left winger for Campeonato Brasileiro Série A side Coritiba.

Club career

Independiente Medellín
Díaz joined Independiente Medellín in 2017 at the age of 15 from Club Linaje FC in Quibdó. He was promoted into the first team squad in 2018 and was summoned to a league game for the first time in November 2018.

His official debut came on 15 July 2019 against Patriotas Boyacá in the Categoría Primera A, when he came in as a substitute for Yesid Díaz in the 73rd minute.

Coritiba
On 11 August 2022 it was confirmed, that Díaz had joined Campeonato Brasileiro Série A side Coritiba on a deal until the end of 2023.

References

External links
 

Living people
2001 births
Colombian footballers
Colombian expatriate footballers
Association football wingers
Categoría Primera A players
Independiente Medellín footballers
Coritiba Foot Ball Club players
Sportspeople from Chocó Department
Colombian expatriate sportspeople in Brazil
Expatriate footballers in Brazil